Some Other Country is the fifth album from the techno group Swayzak, released internationally on 27 August 2007.

Track listing 
"Quiet Life" (feat. Cassy) - 7:25
"So Cheap" - 6:52
"No Sad Goodbyes" (feat. Richard Davis) - 5:33
"Distress and Calling" - 5:18
"Smile and Receive" (feat. Cassy) - 6:18
"Claktronic" - 7:07
"Silent Luv" (feat. Les Fauves) - 5:58
"Pukka Bumbles" - 5:27
"By the Rub of Love" - 6:02
"They Return" - 6:06

Citations and references

External links
 microsite with free track
 Official website discography

2007 albums
Swayzak albums